Callum Moore (born 22 March 2000) is a Scottish professional footballer who plays as a midfielder for Forfar Athletic.

Career
Moore made his debut for Dundee on 23 January 2019, coming on as a substitute in a 1–2 away win against Heart of Midlothian.

He moved on loan to Stenhousemuir in January 2020. In March 2021 following the resumption of the Scottish lower leagues after restrictions being lifted during the COVID-19 pandemic, Moore joined Scottish League One side Forfar Athletic on loan until the end of the season. In June 2021, Moore turned down a new contract offer and left Dundee.

On 16 December 2021, Moore rejoined Forfar Athletic on a deal until the end of the season. After impressing in his short stint, Moore received a one-year contract extension in May 2022. Moore scored his first goal for Forfar in August, in a Scottish Challenge Cup game against Kelty Hearts.

Personal life 
Callum is the brother of fellow footballer and Dundee United player Craig Moore.

Career statistics

References

2000 births
Living people
Scottish footballers
Dundee F.C. players
Stenhousemuir F.C. players
Forfar Athletic F.C. players
Scottish Professional Football League players
Association football midfielders